Barbora Palicová (born 11 March 2004) is a Czech tennis player.

Palicová has a career high WTA ranking of 200 in singles, achieved on 28 November 2022.

Palicová made her WTA Tour main-draw debut at the 2021 Prague Open, where she received a wildcard to the doubles tournament. In singles, she also made her Tour level debut but needs to play in qualifying first.

Junior career
Junior Grand Slam results - Singles:
 Australian Open: –
 French Open: 2R (2021)
 Wimbledon: 1R (2021)
 US Open: –

Junior Grand Slam results - Doubles:
 Australian Open: –
 French Open: 2R (2021)
 Wimbledon: 2R (2021)
 US Open: –

Performance timelines
Only main-draw results in WTA Tour, Grand Slam tournaments, Fed Cup/Billie Jean King Cup and Olympic Games are included in win–loss records.

Singles
Current after the 2023 Australian Open.

Doubles
Current after the 2023 Australian Open.

ITF Circuit finals

Singles: 4 (2 titles, 2 runner–ups)

References

External links
 
 

2004 births
Living people
Czech female tennis players
21st-century Czech women